The white-breasted wood wren (Henicorhina leucosticta) is a small songbird of the wren family. It is a resident breeding species from central Mexico to northeastern Peru and Suriname.

Description
It has chestnut brown upperparts with a darker crown, pale supercilia, and black-and-white streaked sides of the head and neck. The underparts are white becoming buff on the lower belly. The wings and very short tail are barred with black. Young birds have duller upperparts and grey underparts.

Call

The call of this species is a sharp cheek or explosive tuck, and the song is cheer  cheery weather; ornithologist and bioacoustics expert Luis Baptista of the California Academy of Sciences compared it to the opening bars of Beethoven's Fifth Symphony.

As with some other wrens, pairs often sing in duets.

Habitat
Its neat roofed nest is constructed on the ground or occasionally very low in undergrowth, and is concealed by dense vegetation. The eggs are incubated by the female alone for about two weeks to hatching, and the young fledge in about the same length of time again.

The white-breasted wood wren forages actively in low vegetation or on the ground in pairs in family groups. It mainly eats insects and other invertebrates

References

General references:

 Stiles, Gary and Alexander Skutch.  1990.  A Guide to the Birds of Costa Rica

Further reading

white-breasted wood-wren
Birds of Central America
Birds of Colombia
Birds of Venezuela
Birds of the Ecuadorian Amazon
Birds of the Peruvian Amazon
Birds of the Guianas
white-breasted wood wren